Jena Osman is an American poet and editor, who graduated from Brown University, and the State University of New York at Buffalo, with a Ph.D.  She teaches at Temple University. Osman's work has appeared in American Letters & Commentary, Conjunctions, Hambone, Verse, and XCP: Cross-Cultural Poetics.

With Juliana Spahr, she founded and edited Chain. She has been a writing fellow at the MacDowell Colony, the Blue Mountain Center, the Djerassi Foundation, and Chateau de la Napoule.  She inspired the start of Hyphen magazine.

In her ongoing project, "Court Reports," Osman worked directly from court records, judicial opinions bearing the stamp and influence of Charles Reznikoff.

Awards
 2009 National Poetry Series
 2006 Pew Fellowships
 1998 Barnard Women Poets Prize
 National Endowment for the Arts grant
 the New York Foundation for the Arts grant
 The Pennsylvania Council on the Arts grant
 Fund for Poetry grant

Works

 "flag of my disposition"; "hurrah for positive science", 5 Trope
 "THE PERIODIC TABLE AS ASSEMBLED BY DR. ZHIVAGO, OCULIST", Zhivago, 2002-3

Anthologies
 The Best American Poetry 2002, (editor: Robert Creeley)

References

External links
 Jena Osman Website
 "Jena Osman", Penn Sound
 Faculty Homepage at Temple University
 Jena Osman and violist/composer Nadia Sirota interview each other in InDigest

Year of birth missing (living people)
Living people
Brown University alumni
University at Buffalo alumni
Temple University faculty
Pew Fellows in the Arts
American women poets
American women academics
21st-century American women writers
21st-century American poets
20th-century American women writers
20th-century American poets
Writers from Philadelphia
Poets from Pennsylvania